Grandhi Mallikarjuna Rao is a mechanical engineer, billionaire industrialist, the founder chairman of GMR Group, a global infrastructure developer and operator based in India. Started in 1978, GMR Group is now present in 7 countries, active in energy, highways, large urban development and airports sectors, known for building and operating world class national assets.

Early life
G M Rao was born on 14 July 1950, in Rajam, Srikakulam district in Andhra Pradesh, India. He was born in an upper-middle-class family whose main business interests involved commodities trading and a small scale jewelry business started by his father in Rajam. After graduating from Andhra University, Rao joined a paper mill as a shift engineer and then joined the Public Works Department of Andhra Pradesh Government as a junior engineer.

He soon entered the trading of commodities, as his mother had insisted. After developing good relations with suppliers and customers in the business of commodities trading, he acquired a failing jute mill at a bargain, this venture proved to be lucrative and allowed GM Rao to use this leverage from local banks to acquire other assets. Eventually GM Rao divested his stake in a multitude of industries and started a bank named Vysya Bank in collaboration with ING.

Rao eventually diluted his stake in ING Vysya by selling his stake in whole for 340 crores.  The cash from the bank stake sale allowed his entry into the power business allowed Rao to build what would become India leading infrastructure asset developer, as GMR's most relevant competitor, GVK, is 6 times smaller by market capitalization, making GMR Group the leader in India as an airport developer by revenues, asset size, and market capitalization.

In 2014, he was appointed as the chairman of the Andhra Pradesh Skill Development Corporation. The government plans to invest ₹ 700 crore in the skill development initiative, which will train approximately two crore people in 10 years.

Awards
GM Rao received the Economic Times Entrepreneur of the year Award in 2007,.

Charity 
Its CSR arm, GMR Varalakshmi Foundation, currently serves the underserved sections of society in 22 locations. In 2012, he donated 1,540 crores for charitable purposes. He mentioned in an interview that Warren Buffett is an inspiration for him to pledge his money in support of 'Giving back to society'.

In 2013, by donating 740 crores, G. M. Rao was the third generous donor of corporate India for the year as per the China's Harun Report Inc.

GMR Varalakshmi Foundation (GMRVF), is the Corporate Social Responsibility arm of the GMR Group. Its objectives are to develop social infrastructure and enhance the quality of life of communities around the locations that has the Group's presence. This non-profit (Section 25) company has its own staff and is Governed by Group Chairman, GMR Group.

References

External links
Forbes India's Richest
Forbes World's Richest
International Herald Tribune
Rediff.com news article
Business today news article 
Economic Times article

Indian billionaires
1950 births
Businesspeople from Andhra Pradesh
Indian chief executives
Living people
People from Srikakulam district
People from Uttarandhra
Indian Premier League franchise owners